Vyacheslav German (born 17 July 1972) is a Belarusian cyclist. He competed in the men's individual road race at the 1996 Summer Olympics.

References

External links
 

1972 births
Living people
Belarusian male cyclists
Olympic cyclists of Belarus
Cyclists at the 1996 Summer Olympics
Place of birth missing (living people)